Roland Edward William George Horridge (born 27 January 1963) is an English cricketer.  Horridge is a right-handed batsman who bowls right-arm medium pace.  He was born at Radcliffe, Lancashire.

He captained Chorley from 1990 to 1999, leading the club to an unprecedented three successive finals (1994,1995 and 1996) in the National Club Cricket Championship, winning in 1994 and 1995. The club were awarded nine trophies during his captainship.

An aggressive leader, Horridge took no prisoners leading to many a confrontation on and off the pitch. Whilst "Handbag" secured many cup competition wins for Chorley the league title eluded him as opponents often colluded against them to make sure they didn't win vital matches that could have won the league. Chorley were runners up SIX times in nine years under his captaincy. He remains involved at the club, offering his advice on a regular basis.

Horridge represented the Lancashire Cricket Board in List A cricket.  His debut List A match came against the Netherlands in the 1999 NatWest Trophy.  From 1999 to 2002, he represented the Board in 5 List A matches, the last of which came against Cheshire in the 1st round of the 2002 Cheltenham & Gloucester Trophy which was played in 2001.  In his 5 List A matches, he scored 69 runs at a batting average of 23.00, with a high score of 67*.

Horridge also played rugby in the Hong Kong Sevens in 1984.

References

External links
Roland Horridge at Cricinfo
Roland Horridge at CricketArchive

1963 births
Living people
Cricketers from Bury, Greater Manchester
English cricketers
Lancashire Cricket Board cricketers
People from Radcliffe, Greater Manchester